Brown hare may refer to:

Cape hare (Lepus capensis)
European hare (Lepus europaeus)

See also
 Brown hair

Animal common name disambiguation pages